Desertores Islands are a group of islands in the Sea of Chiloé, between Chiloé Island and the mainland of Chile. They are the easternmost islands of the Chiloé Archipelago. They are administered as part of the Chaitén commune, in the Palena Province, unlike the rest of the Archipelago, which forms Chiloé Province.  Talcan, the biggest and easternmost of the Desertores Islands, is just six km from the mainland.

The six main islands are Auten, Chuit, Chulin, Imerquiña, Nayahue and Talcan. There are several smaller islands, including Silla del Diablo, which lies halfway between Chulin and the mainland.

Archipelagoes of Chile
Islands of Chiloé Archipelago
Islands of Los Lagos Region
Archipelagoes of the Pacific Ocean